Coaraci is a municipality in the state of Bahia in the North-East region of Brazil.

The municipality contains part of the  Lagoa Encantada e Rio Almada Environmental Protection Area, created in 1993.

See also
List of municipalities in Bahia

References

Municipalities in Bahia